MFL MarMac Community School District is a rural public school district headquartered in Monona, Iowa. It operates an elementary school and high school in Monona and a separate middle school in McGregor.

The district is within Clayton and Allamakee counties. It serves Monona, McGregor, Farmersburg, Luana, and Marquette.

History
The district formed on July 1, 1994, with the merger of the Mar-Mac and M-F-L districts.

In 2003, the district had about 1,000 students.

Schools
MFL MarMac Elementary School, Monona
McGregor Intermediate School, McGregor
MFL MarMac Middle School, McGregor
MFL MarMac High School, Monona

Predecessor Schools
M-F-L
Monona-Farmersburg
Monona
Farmersburg
Luana
Mar-Mac
McGregor
Marquette Community

MFL MarMac High School

Athletics
The Bulldogs compete in the Upper Iowa Conference in the following sports:

Cross Country
Volleyball
Football
Basketball
Wrestling
Track and Field 
Golf 
Baseball 
Softball

The Monona high school baseball team was the fall season state champions in 1947 (fall) and 1948 (spring) and the MFL high school baseball team was the Class 1A summer state champions in 1976.

See also
List of school districts in Iowa
List of high schools in Iowa

References

External links
 MFL MarMac Community School District

School districts in Iowa
Education in Allamakee County, Iowa
Education in Clayton County, Iowa
1994 establishments in Iowa
School districts established in 1994